Héctor Fresina (born c. 1968) was a provincial deputy in Mendoza Province in Argentina.

He is a member of the Workers' Party (Argentina) and was elected in October 2013 as a candidate of the Workers' Left Front.

External links
article

1960s births
People from Mendoza Province
Workers' Party (Argentina) politicians
Living people
Place of birth missing (living people)
Year of birth uncertain
21st-century Argentine politicians